Perrierophytum is a genus of flowering plants belonging to the family Malvaceae.

It is native to Mozambique and Madagascar.

The genus name of Perrierophytum is in honour of Joseph Marie Henry Alfred Perrier de la Bâthie (1873–1958), a French botanist who specialized in the plants of Madagascar. It was first described and published in Annuaire Conserv. Jard. Bot. Genève Vols.18-19 on page 229 in 1915.

Known species
According to Kew:
Perrierophytum glomeratum 
Perrierophytum hispidum 
Perrierophytum humbertianthus 
Perrierophytum humbertii 
Perrierophytum luteum 
Perrierophytum paniculatum 
Perrierophytum rubrum 
Perrierophytum viridiflorum 
Perrierophytum viscosum

References

Hibisceae
Malvaceae genera
Plants described in 1915
Flora of Mozambique
Flora of Madagascar